Juremi Gregorius Profar (born January 30, 1996) is a Curaçaoan professional baseball infielder for the Québec Capitales of the Frontier League.

Career

Texas Rangers
Profar signed with the Texas Rangers as an international free agent in 2012. He made his professional debut in 2013 with the DSL Rangers and spent the whole season there, batting .281/.361/.350 with 44 RBIs in 63 games. In 2014, he played for the Spokane Indians where he batted .247 with one home run and 36 RBIs in 67 games. He also played in seven games for the Hickory Crawdads and two games for the Round Rock Express. Profar spent 2015 with the High Desert Mavericks and Hickory where he compiled a .266 batting average with four home runs and 33 RBIS in 77 games between both teams, 2016 with High Desert where he slashed .300/.355/.473 with 13 home runs, 58 RBIs, and an .827 OPS in 103 games, and 2017 with the Frisco RoughRiders where he batted .263 with ten home runs and forty RBIs in 109 games. Profar spent the 2018 season with Frisco, hitting .232/.283/.352/.636 with 10 home runs and 51 RBI. Profar split the 2019 season between Frisco and the Nashville Sounds, hitting a combined .265/.324/.394/.718 with 10 home runs and 60 RBI. Profar played for the Netherlands national baseball team at the 2019 WBSC Premier12. He became a free agent following the 2019 season.

Boston Red Sox
On November 22, 2019, Profar signed a minor league contract with the Boston Red Sox. Profar did not play in a game in 2020 due to the cancellation of the minor league season because of the COVID-19 pandemic. He was released by the Red Sox on May 29, 2020.

Bravos de León
On February 17, 2022, Profar signed with the Bravos de León of the Mexican League. Profar appeared in 6 games for León, going 6-for-23 with 2 RBI. He was released on May 23, 2022.

Québec Capitales
On February 14, 2023, Profar signed with the Québec Capitales of the Frontier League.

Personal
Profar is the younger brother of infielder Jurickson Profar.

References

External links

1996 births
Living people
People from Willemstad
Curaçao expatriate baseball players in Mexico
Curaçao expatriate baseball players in the United States
Baseball infielders
Minor league baseball players
Bravos de León players
Dominican Summer League Rangers players
Curaçao expatriate baseball players in the Dominican Republic
Spokane Indians players
Hickory Crawdads players
High Desert Mavericks players
Frisco RoughRiders players
Round Rock Express players
Nashville Sounds players
2023 World Baseball Classic players